In particle physics, wave mechanics and optics, momentum transfer is the amount of momentum that one particle gives to another particle. It is also called the scattering vector as it describes the transfer of wavevector in wave mechanics.

In the simplest example of scattering of two colliding particles with initial momenta , resulting in final momenta , the momentum transfer is given by

where the last identity expresses momentum conservation. Momentum transfer is an important quantity because  is a better measure for the typical distance resolution of the reaction than the momenta themselves.

Wave mechanics and optics
A wave has a momentum  and is a vectorial quantity. The difference of the momentum of the scattered wave to the incident wave is called momentum transfer. The wave number k is the absolute of the wave vector  and is related to the wavelength . Momentum transfer is given in wavenumber units in reciprocal space

Diffraction
The momentum transfer plays an important role in the evaluation of neutron, X-ray and electron diffraction for the investigation of condensed matter. As momentum is conserved, the transfer of momentum occurs to crystal momentum.

The presentation in reciprocal space is generic and does not depend on the type of radiation and wavelength used but only on the sample system, which allows to compare results obtained from many different methods. Some established communities such as powder diffraction employ the diffraction angle  as the independent variable, which worked fine in the early years when only a few characteristic wavelengths such as Cu-K were available. The relationship to -space is

See also
 Atomic form factor
 Mandelstam variables
 Momentum-transfer cross section
 Impulse (physics)

Diffraction
Momentum
Neutron-related techniques
Synchrotron-related techniques